Saint-Vérand is the name of 3 communes in France:

 Saint-Vérand, Isère
 Saint-Vérand, Rhône
 Saint-Vérand, Saône-et-Loire

See also
 Saint-Véran Lake, a waterbody of the Moncouche River in Quebec, Canada]
 Saint-Véran, a commune in the Hautes-Alpes department
 Saint-Véran AOC, a white Burgundy wine from the area around Saint-Vérand, Saône-et-Loire